Washington County is a county in the U.S. state of New York. As of the 2020 census, the population was 61,302. The county seat is Fort Edward. The county was named for U.S. President George Washington.

Washington County is part of the Glens Falls, NY Metropolitan Statistical Area, which is also included in the Albany-Schenectady, NY Combined Statistical Area.

History
When counties were established in the colony of New York in 1683, the present Washington County was part of Albany County. This was an enormous county, including the northern part of New York State as well as all of the present state of Vermont and, in theory, extending westward to the Pacific Ocean. This county was reduced in size on July 3, 1766, by the creation of Cumberland County, and further on March 16, 1770, by the creation of Gloucester County, both containing territory now in Vermont.

On March 12, 1772, what was left of Albany County was split into three parts, one remaining under the name Albany County. The other two were called Tryon County (later renamed Montgomery County) and Charlotte County.

On April 2, 1784, Charlotte County was renamed Washington County in honor of George Washington, the American Revolutionary War general and later President of the United States of America.

In 1788, Clinton County was split off from Washington County. This was a much larger area than the present Clinton County, including several other counties or county parts of the present New York State.

In 1791, the Town of Cambridge was transferred from Albany County to Washington County.

In 1813, Warren County was split off from Washington County.

In 1994, with the completion of the new municipal center, the county seat was moved from Hudson Falls to Fort Edward.

In 2006, Cambridge Town Supervisor Jo Ann Trinkle made history by being elected as the first chairwoman of the Board of Supervisors.

Historic sites
Washington County has four historic covered bridges, each listed on the National Register of Historic Places:
 Buskirk Bridge
 Eagleville Bridge
 Rexleigh Bridge
 Shushan Bridge
Including those, it has a total of 35 sites listed on the National Register. The Lemuel Haynes House is designated as a National Historic Landmark, the highest level of significance.

Geography

Washington County is a long narrow county located in the northeastern section of the State. It is known for its rich valley farm land and is part of the Great Appalachian Valley (also known simply as the 'Great Valley') which is a long narrow valley strip often between tall mountain ranges. The county transitions from the Taconic Mountains to the Adirondack Mountains, and from the Lake Champlain Valley to Hudson River Valley.

Much of the county is part of the slate valley of the Upper Taconic Mountains (Taghkanic, meaning 'in the trees'). The eastern boundary of Washington County is the New York–Vermont border, part of which is Lake Champlain. This is also the border with New England proper. The northern end of the county is within the 6.1 million acre Adirondack Park. Western boundaries include primarily the Hudson River and Lake George.

Washington County belongs to the following valleys and watersheds: Champlain Valley / Lake George Watershed—02010001  Hudson River Valley / Hudson-Hoosic Watershed—02020003   Waters in the northern part drain into Lake Champlain via Lake George (Horican) or the Mettawee River, and then flow into the Saint Lawrence River (Kaniatarowanenneh). These waters mingle in the Saint Lawrence with waters of all the Great Lakes as they flow northeast into the Gulf of Saint Lawrence, and ultimately join the Atlantic Ocean. Meanwhile, the remainder of waters drain south via the Hudson River (Muh-he-kun-ne-tuk or Muhheakantuck), and ultimately flow south into the Atlantic Ocean below New York City. See the approximation of the watershed divide mapped in context of mountains  and valleys.

Nearly half of its borders are by long bodies of water. Winding across the bottom of the county is the legendary Batten Kill (Dionondehowa), famous for its worldclass flyfishing, and its marvelous falls (near the Washington County fairgrounds).

Willard Mountain is a ski center in the southern part of the county.

Adjacent counties
 Essex County – north
 Addison County, Vermont – northeast
 Rutland County, Vermont – east
 Bennington County, Vermont – southeast
 Rensselaer County – south
 Saratoga County – southwest
 Warren County – west

Demographics

As of the census of 2000, there were 61,042 people, 22,458 households, and 15,787 families residing in the county. The population density was 73 people per square mile (28/km2). There were 26,794 housing units at an average density of 32 per square mile (12/km2). The racial makeup of the county was 94.97% White, 2.92% Black or African American, 0.20% Native American, 0.28% Asian, 0.01% Pacific Islander, 0.84% from other races, and 0.77% from two or more races. 2.02% of the population were Hispanic or Latino of any race. 17.5% were of Irish, 14.1% French, 12.1% English, 11.1% American, 9.0% Italian and 7.7% German ancestry according to Census 2000. 96.9% spoke English and 1.4% Spanish as their first language.

There were 22,458 households, out of which 33.20% had children under the age of 18 living with them, 55.20% were married couples living together, 10.40% had a female householder with no husband present, and 29.70% were non-families. 24.00% of all households were made up of individuals, and 10.80% had someone living alone who was 65 years of age or older. The average household size was 2.55 and the average family size was 3.01.

In the county, the population was spread out, with 24.60% under the age of 18, 8.30% from 18 to 24, 29.40% from 25 to 44, 23.70% from 45 to 64, and 14.00% who were 65 years of age or older. The median age was 38 years. For every 100 females there were 105.20 males. For every 100 females age 18 and over, there were 104.50 males.

The median income for a household in the county was $37,668, and the median income for a family was $43,500. Males had a median income of $31,537 versus $22,160 for females. The per capita income for the county was $17,958. About 6.80% of families and 9.40% of the population were below the poverty line, including 12.30% of those under age 18 and 7.30% of those age 65 or over.

2020 Census

Government 
The county government consists of a board of supervisors with weighted votes. Each town supervisor holds a seat on the county government, and their votes are based on the population of their town, with Kingsbury and Fort Edward supervisors having the largest number of votes, and Putnam having the fewest votes. The 2017 weighted vote totals are available on the county website.

Politics
Prior to 1996, Washington County was a Republican stronghold, with the only time between 1884 & 1992 that a Republican presidential candidate failed to win the county being 1964 when Barry Goldwater lost every county in New York in his statewide & national landslide loss. Since 1996, it has become a bellwether county, but Republican candidate margins of victory have been greater than those by Democratic candidates and broke its bellwether streak in 2020 when Donald Trump won the county. In his 2020 performance, Trump received the highest percentage of the vote for a Republican since 1988 when George H. W. Bush received 62 percent. No Democrat aside from Lyndon B. Johnson in the aforementioned 1964 election has managed to win majority of the county's votes.

|}

Transportation

Airports 
The following public use airports are located in the county:
 Argyle Airport (1C3) – Argyle
 Chapin Field (1B8) – Cambridge
 Granville Airport (B01) – Granville

Rail 
Amtrak's Adirondack and Ethan Allen Express services each travel through Washington County once a day in each direction on their routes between New York City and Montreal or Burlington, respectively. Both routes stop in Fort Edward and the Adirondack additionally serves Whitehall. The Adirondack was temporarily suspended as of March 2020 due to the closure of the Canadian/American border in response to the COVID-19 pandemic. As of fall 2022, a service resumption date has not yet been announced.

Communities

Towns

 Argyle
 Cambridge
 Dresden
 Easton
 Fort Ann
 Fort Edward (county seat)
 Granville
 Greenwich
 Hampton
 Hartford
 Hebron
 Jackson
 Kingsbury
 Putnam
 Salem
 White Creek
 Whitehall

Villages

 Argyle
 Cambridge
 Fort Ann
 Fort Edward
 Granville
 Greenwich
 Hudson Falls
 Whitehall

Census-designated places
 North Granville
 Salem

Hamlets
 East Greenwich
 East Lake George
 Goose Island
 Huletts Landing
 Kattskill Bay
 Shushan

Notable people
 Frank Buckley Walker, a talent agent who discovered the likes of Bessie Smith and Hank Williams.
 Townsend Harris, the first United States Consul-General to Japan.
 Chester A. Arthur – Lived in Greenwich/Union Village for five years in his youth before becoming 21st President of the United States in 1881.
 Grandma Moses, American painter
 Josh Carter, musician in American music duo Phantogram
 Susan B. Anthony (February 15, 1820 – March 13, 1906) was a prominent American civil rights leader who played a pivotal role in the 19th-century women's rights movement to gain women's suffrage in the United States. She moved with her family to Battenville, New York when she was six.
 Solomon Northup was a free-born African American fiddler who had a farm in Hebron before moving to Saratoga Springs. Kidnapped in 1841 and sold into slavery in Louisiana, he was freed in 1853, and that year published his memoir Twelve Years a Slave (1853). In 1984, the memoir was adapted as a PBS television movie entitled Solomon Northup's Odyssey, directed by Gordon Parks; in 2013 it was adapted as a feature movie 12 Years a Slave (film).
 Sigurd Raschèr (pronounced 'Rah-sher') (15 May 1907 in Elberfeld, Germany – 25 February 2001 in Shushan, New York) was an American saxophonist of German birth. He became one of the most important figures in the development of the 20th century repertoire for the concert saxophone.
 James Howard Kunstler (b. October 19, 1948). Author of The Geography of Nowhere, The Long Emergency, and the World Made By Hand novel series.
 Frank J. Kimball, Wisconsin State Assemblyman, was born in Washington County.
 Curtis Mann, Wisconsin State Senator, was born in Washington County.
 E. D. Rogers, Wisconsin State Assembly, was born in Washington County.
 John L. Beveridge, 16th Governor of Illinois (January 23, 1873 – January 8, 1877), 18th Lt. Governor of Illinois (January 13, 1873 – January 23, 1873), Member from Illinois of the U.S. House of Representatives, (42nd Congress), Republican Party, born in town of Greenwich in Washington County on July 6, 1824
James M. Hinds (December 5, 1833 – October 22, 1868) was born and raised in the town of Hebron in Washington County. He served in the U.S. House of Representatives from July to October 1868 representing the 2nd Congressional District of Arkansas as a Republican. He became the first congressional representative to be assassinated while in office after being targeted by the Ku Klux Klan for advocating for civil rights for former slaves. He is buried in Salem's Evergreen Cemetery.

See also

 List of counties in New York
 National Register of Historic Places listings in Washington County, New York

Notes

References

Further reading
 
 Johnson, Crisfield, History of Washington County, New York: With Illustrations and Biographical Sketches of Some of Its Prominent Men and Pioneers. Philadelphia: Everts and Ensign, 1878.

External links
 Washington County, New York Official Website

History
 Political history/notable people of Washington County
 Richard Clayton Photography Vintage Washington County, New York and area photos
 Old Landowners Map of Washington County
 Twelve Years a Slave at Internet Archive (scanned books original editions color illustrated)

Watershed/Conservancy
 Lake George Watershed – 02010001 Northern Hebron's north-draining waters
 Hudson-Hoosic Watershed – 02020003 Hebron's south-draining waters
 Mountains of Northern Appalachians Thick red line shows approx watershed divide
 Watershed divide Map of Champlain/Hudson valley divide w/Taconics
 Association for the Protection of the Adirondacks
 Adirondack Council
 Residents' Committee to Protect the Adirondacks
 Adirondack Mountain Club (ADK)
  Poultney Mettowee Watershed Partnership
 Lake George Land Conservancy
 Hudson River Watershed Alliance
 Battenkill Conservancy
 Battenkill Watershed Council

State agencies
 NYS Adirondack Park Agency - Extensive park information
 Adirondack Park Visitor Interpretive Centers

Museums
  Hyde Collection Art Museum, Historic House & Gardens
 Rexleigh Covered Bridge Museum
 Georgi Museum  European Art
 Slate Valley Museum
 Rathbuns Maple Sugar House Museum and Restaurant
 Hicks Orchard
 Pember Library and Museum

 
Glens Falls metropolitan area
1772 establishments in the Province of New York
Populated places established in 1772